Quảng Sơn is a rural commune (xã) and village in Ba Đồn town, Quảng Bình Province, in Vietnam. This is a mountainous area. Nan River, a tributary of Gianh River flows across this commune.

Populated places in Quảng Bình province
Communes of Quảng Bình province